Kuti Valley is a Himalayan valley situated in the Pithoragarh District, Kumaon division of the Uttarakhand state of India. Located in the eastern part of Uttarakhand, it is the last valley before the border with Tibet. It runs along a NW to SE axis, formed by the river Kuti Yankti, which is one of the headwaters of the Kali River that forms the boundary between India and Nepal in this region. 

This valley is mainly dominated by Byansis, one of the four Bhotiya communities of Kumaon, with the others being Johar, Darmiya and Chaudansi. In May 2020, Nepal laid claim to the northeastern half of the valley, claiming that Kuthi Yanki represented the Kali River and it was meant to be Nepal's border by the 1816 Sugauli Treaty. India said that the claim was not based on historical facts and evidence.

Kuthi Yankti 

Kuthi Yankti is one of the two headwaters of the Kali River, the other being the Kalapani River that flows down from the Lipulekh Pass.

Kuthi Yankti emerges from slopes near Wilsha, below the Limpiyadhura range, and passes Lake Jolingkong at an altitude of 4,630 m, to the Kuti village. It flows southeast to merge with the Kalapani River near the Gunji village to form the Kali River (or Sharada River). High Himalayan passes of Mangsha Dhura (5,490 m) and Limpiya Dhura (5,530 m) are situated along the northern border of the Kuthi valley joining it with Tibet. Shin La pass and Nama pass join Darma Valley to Kuthi valley from the south. Jolingkong and Parvati are main alpine lakes. Sangthang Peak is the highest along the line of peaks forming the northern boundary of the valley with Tibet. Among the peaks forming the southern boundary of the valley, notable peaks are Brammah Parvat (6,321 m), Cheepaydang (6,220 m) and Adi Kailash (5,945 m).

Byans and Byansis 
Kuthi Yankti is part of the Byans ethnographic region, which comprises Kuthi valley as well as the Kali River valley within its vicinity and the Tinkar valley in Nepal. The people of this region are called Byansis, who speak a distinctive Byangsi language. There are five Byans villages in the Kuthi valley (Gunji, Nabi, Rongkang, Napalchu and Kuti), two along the Kali River (Budi and Garbyang) and two in the Tinkar valley (Chhangru and Tinkar). In later times, two new villages were founded in Nepal (Rapla and Sitaula). Garbyang, at the junction of Tinkar River with Kali, is the largest.

Nepalese claims 
The Byans region was originally part of Kumaon and the whole of Kumaon was under rule of Nepal (Gorkha) for 25 years.  After the Anglo-Nepalese War and the ensuing Treaty of Sugauli, the Kali River was agreed as the border between Kumaon and Nepal. In 1817, the Nepal Darbar claimed the villages of Tinkar and Chhangru as per the terms of the treaty, and the British Governor General acquiesced. The Nepalese then made the further claim that the Kuthi valley also belonged to them on the grounds that Kuthi Yankti was the main headwater  of Kali. This claim was rejected by the British on the grounds that, by tradition and convention, the Kali River is taken to begin at the Kalapani village, where the dark-coloured springs flowing into the river give it the name "Kali". ("Kali" means black in Hindi.)

The claim to the Kuthi Valley was revived by the Nepalese geographer Buddhi Narayan Shrestha in 1999, who, after studying old maps of the early 19th century, came to the conclusion that "the origin of Mahakali River lies almost 16 kilometres northwest of Kalapani at Limpiyadhura". In May 2020, the Nepalese government made the claim official by endorsing a new map of Nepal that shows the Kuthi Valley as part of Nepal. The Prime Minister K. P. Oli declared that the country would "reclaim" it. India responded that it was a unilateral act that was "not based on historical facts and evidence".

See also 
 Kalapani territory – for the territorial dispute between India and Nepal

References

Bibliography 
 
 
 
 
 
 
 
 

Valleys of Uttarakhand
Geography of Pithoragarh district
Territorial disputes of Nepal